Shyne Factory was a Canadian progressive rock and power pop band from Halifax, Nova Scotia.

History
After releasing two EPs in 1994 and 1995, the band recorded it first full-length album of power pop music, Candy Coated, in 1997.

In 2000, the band was nominated for an East Coast Music Award. That year, the band's self-produced video, "I'm Not Sorry", was played regularly on MuchMusic.

The band continued to perform in eastern Canada, including an appearance at the Snow Jam festival in Halifax in 2001. An album, Hell or High Water, was released in 2003, and toured across Canada in support, including a stop in Montreal.

By 2004, Shyne Factory had disbanded.

Discography

EPs
1994: Canvas (Release Records)
1995: Pop Art (Release Records)

Albums
1997: Candy Coated (No Records)
1999: Lava (Red Liquorice)
2003: Hell or High Water (EMI Canada)

Singles
2000: "Bring Me Down"
2003: "The Moment"
2003: "Losing Out"

References

External links
Muchmusic.com/The Moment
Muchmusic.com/Losing Out
Shyne Factory on Last.fm

Musical groups established in 1992
Musical groups disestablished in 2004
Musical groups from Halifax, Nova Scotia
Canadian alternative rock groups
Canadian progressive rock groups
1992 establishments in Nova Scotia
2004 disestablishments in Nova Scotia